The 1921–22 international cricket season was from September 1921 to April 1922. The season consists with one major international tour.

Season overview

November

Australia in South Africa

References

International cricket competitions by season
1921 in cricket
1922 in cricket